Club Sportivo Patria is a football club from Formosa, Argentina. The team currently plays in Torneo Federal A, the regionalised third division of the Argentine football league system.

The club has only played one season at the top level of Argentine football, in 1976, when Sportivo contested the Campeonato Nacional, finishing 8th out of nine clubs in group C and failed to qualify to the next stage.

Other football clubs in Formosa 
 Club Sportivo General San Martín
 Club Atlético Laguna Blanca
 Club Sol de América
 Club Social, Cultural y Deportivo 13 de Junio

External links

Raza Decana 
La Página del Decano 
Soy de Patria 

Football clubs in Formosa Province
Association football clubs established in 1911
1911 establishments in Argentina